Lyndey Milan, OAM is an Australian media personality. For over 30 years she has been one of Australia's recognised food and cooking show personalities, contributing to both TV, radio and print media. She was co-host on the channel 9 show Fresh with the Australian Women's Weekly and she was the Food Director for The Australian Women's Weekly.

Milan attended Wenona School in North Sydney, New South Wales. She was the mother of actor/television presenter Blair Milan. They had recently completed filming Lyndey and Blair's Taste of Greece when Blair was diagnosed with acute myeloid leukaemia. He died on 17 April 2011, at age 29.

She has written nine cookbooks, hosted eight TV series and is a regional Australian specialist who makes numerous TV and culinary appearances.

Milan is creative director of Flame Media and Flame Studio in Sydney.

Recognition
In 2014, Milan was awarded a Medal of the Order of Australia (OAM) for her "services to hospitality, particularly to the food and wine industry, and to the community".

References

External links

Australian television actresses
People from Sydney
Australian television personalities
Women television personalities
Year of birth missing (living people)
Living people
Australian writers
Recipients of the Medal of the Order of Australia